Leopold Lewin (28 July 1910 in Piotrków Trybunalski – 7 December 1995 in Warsaw) was a Polish poet, journalist and translator. He graduated the Warsaw University in 1931. In the years 1939-1944 on emigration in USSR. Arrested by NKVD in June 1942, he later became a Polish communist, joining the Union of Polish Patriots there, and was an author of many socrealistic poems (like 'Song of United Parties' - 'Pieśń Partii Zjednoczonych'). After the war he was an editor of several Polish newspapers and the Secretary General of the Polish Literary Society.

References
Short bio in English

1910 births
1995 deaths
20th-century Polish poets